The Alliance for Securing Democracy (ASD) is a bi-partisan transatlantic national security advocacy group formed in July 2017 with the stated aim of countering efforts by Russia to undermine democratic institutions in the United States and Europe. As of 2021, it had expanded to combating the malign influence of the Chinese and Iranian governments and their state-backed media outlets. 

The organization is chaired and run primarily by former senior United States intelligence and State Department officials. Its daily operations are led by Zack Cooper, a research fellow at the American Enterprise Institute. Laura Thornton, formerly of International IDEA, joined the group as its new director in May of 2021. Laura Rosenberger, senior director for China on the Biden administration's National Security Council previously served as a director of the ASD. The ASD is housed at the German Marshall Fund of the United States and pursues its work in both the United States and Europe.

History 
In 2016, the CIA, FBI, NSA, and the Director of National Intelligence concluded that Russia had interfered in US elections of that year. The Alliance for Securing Democracy declared that it will develop strategies to "defend against, deter, and raise the costs" on any attempts by Russia or "other state actors" to undermine democracy. Former acting CIA Director Michael Morell, who serves on ASD's advisory council, stated that the group will fulfill some of the role that ideally would have been handled by a national investigative commission.

Hamilton 68 Dashboard 
The original iteration of the Hamilton 68 Dashboard, released in 2017, tracked 600 Twitter accounts that ASD asserted might be "linked to Russian influence," whether knowingly or unknowingly. ASD did not disclose which accounts the original version of Hamilton 68 tracked, citing its desire to "focus on the behavior of the overall network rather than get dragged into hundreds of individual debates over which troll fits which role."Responding to what ASD viewed as inaccurate reporting on its dashboard, ASD's communications director, Bret Schafer, stated in a piece published on The Daily Caller they don't specifically track automated bot accounts. Schafer noted "…that results on the dashboard are meant to be viewed in a nuanced way […]" and that not all instances of information appearing on the dashboard were evidence of pro-Kremlin accounts or biases.

The original version of Hamilton 68 was shutdown in 2018.
 
Version 2.0 of the Hamilton 68 Dashboard, released in 2019, tracks approximately 600 Twitter social media accounts that the ASD asserts can be "directly attribute[d] to the Russian, Chinese, or Iranian governments or their various news and information channels." The list of Twitter accounts currently tracked by Hamilton 2.0 has been released.

In September 2017, and again in May of 2021, the group launched similar German-language dashboards focused on possible Russian influence in German politics ahead of the federal elections in those respective years.

In January 2023, journalist Matt Taibbi tweeted about internal Twitter documents related to Hamilton 68 that had been given him by CEO Elon Musk as part of the Twitter Files. The documents show that Twitter's former Head of Trust and Safety, Yoel Roth, attempted to identify the accounts tracked in the dashboard. Roth found that only 36 of the 644 accounts he identified were registered in Russia and argued that the dashboard used "shoddy methodology" to incorrectly label authentic accounts as "Russian stooges without evidence". ASD responded to Taibbi's release a few days later, noting that ASD had always maintained that not all of the accounts on the dashboard were controlled by Russia, despite what it described as persistent misunderstandings in the media. The National Desk's Sinnenberg counters Taibbi's criticisms as being hyperbolic.

Reception 
The Hamilton 68 Dashboard has been cited by many news outlets, including The New York Times, The Washington Post, NPR, and Business Insider. Previously, the dashboard had received criticism for its "secret methodology" and refusal to disclose the Twitter accounts it tracks. ASD founders Laura Rosenberger and Jamie Fly said that the accounts are not disclosed to prevent Russia from shutting them down. James Carden wrote in The Nation that the dashboard seemed to characterize factual news items as Russian propaganda and questioned its impact on political discourse.

Advisory council and staff 
The ASD is governed by an Advisory Council and an operating staff who are drawn from the American Marshall Fund. The Washington Post called the membership of the advisory council "a who's who of former senior national security officials from both [the Democratic and Republican] parties." Members of the advisory council include Michael Chertoff (a Republican who worked in the George W. Bush administration as U.S. Secretary of Homeland Security) and Mike McFaul (a Democrat who worked in the Obama administration as U.S. Ambassador to Russia), former Estonian president Toomas Hendrik Ilves, neoconservative political analyst and commentator William Kristol, and Hillary Clinton foreign-policy adviser Jake Sullivan.

Reception 
In a 2017 article in The Atlantic, Peter Beinart argued that the group's efforts were important in understanding Russia's involvement in American politics. Glenn Greenwald wrote that the group represented a political alliance between neoconservatives and establishment Democrats.

See also 
 PropOrNot

References

External links 
 

2017 establishments in the United States
Political organizations established in 2017
Organizations associated with Russian interference in the 2016 United States elections